Muktodhara is a 2012 Bengali film directed by Shiboprosad Mukherjee and Nandita Roy. This is a story about the prisoners of a correctional home ‒ Presidency jail who all have a dark past life but here they are being reformed day by day.

Plot 
Niharika Chatterjee is the wife of public prosecutor Arindam Chatterjee. Arindam is a dominating husband and a male chauvinist. Niharika is unhappy with her married life. They both have a sweet little child who is deaf and dumb. Niharika organises a party for girls who are physically challenged like her own daughter. There, she meets the new Inspector General of correctional cells of West Bengal, Mr. Brij Narayan Dutta. The latter informs Niharika of his plans and ideas of reforming convicts of the correctional cells. Being aware of Niharika's talent and skills, he requests Niharika to help him organize an event with the prisoners. Niharika agrees to the proposal with a condition that her husband needs to be kept in the dark. One day, while they were having a rehearsal, Niharika wishes to stage Rabindranath Tagore's Valmiki-Pratibha involving the inmates of the correctional cells. Niharika informs Mr. Brij Narayan Dutta about it, who likes the idea and approves the proposal. In the cellular jail, Yusuf Mohammad is a very well-known criminal. He is accused of murder, kidnapping, et al. Mr. Brij Narayan Dutta wants him to be in the play. He succeeds in convincing Yusuf Mohammad. It is he who later becomes Niharika's main protagonist in the stage play. Yusuf Mohammad gradually changes as Niharika keeps training them. They plan to escape from the correctional home on the day of the play. But, the feeling of guilt engulfs Yusuf Mohammad and though they get out of the correctional home through a tunnel, they return and complete the play.

Cast 
 Rituparna Sengupta as Niharika Chatterjee
 Nigel Akkara as Yusuf Mohd Khan
 Bratya Basu as Arindam Chatterjee
 Debshankar Haldar as Brij Narayan Dutta
 Kharaj Mukherjee as Lakhan Panda
 Suchitra Chakraborty as Spriha
 Shiboprosad Mukherjee as Happy Singh
 Shambhunath Shaw as Nagen
 Arjun Sharma as Firdous
 Sarit Shekhar Banerjee as shyamal
 Milan kundu as Babu

Crew  
 Banner: Progressive Films
 Producers: Bachchu Biswas & Atanu Raychaudhuri
 Directors: Nandita Roy & Shiboprosad Mukherjee
 Story: Nandita Roy & Shiboprosad Mukherjee
 Screenplay: Nandita Roy & Shiboprosad Mukherjee
 Director of Photography: Anil Singh
 Music Director: Joy Sarkar & Surojit Chatterjee
 Choreographer: Alokananda Roy
 Editor: Malay Laha
 Production Designer: Nitish Roy
 Art Director: Arup Ghosh & Tuntun
 Stage Designers: Piyali-Saumik
 Sound Designer: Anup Mukherjee
 Costume Designer: Radhika Singhi

Soundtrack

Direction  
Nandita Roy is an Indian filmmaker, screenplay writer and producer. She has been working in the film industry for the past 30 years. She has worked in many television serials and National Award-winning films. Shiboprosad Mukherjee is an Indian filmmaker, actor and producer. He started his acting career by joining the Theatre in Education Project and was a regular theatre artiste at Nandikar. He learnt his art from celebrated thespians like Rudraprasad Sengupta and Ibrahim Alkazi. 
The director duo ventured into cinema in 2011, with their first film, Icche. From then on, they have co-directed films like Accident (2012), Muktodhara (2012), Alik Sukh (2013), Ramdhanu (2014), Belaseshe (2015), Praktan (2016) Posto (2017), Haami (2018), Konttho (2019), Gotro (2019), which have been critically acclaimed and commercially successful. Their films have been appreciated for their socially relevant content and entertaining narrative structure

Making  
Nigel Akkara was a hardened criminal, who had resisted all attempts of reformation till a renowned dancer visited the Presidency Correctional Home and began a therapy session. He delivered a powerful performance in Muktodhara, a film loosely based on his life and transformation. 
Alokananda Ray decided to stage the dance drama, Valmiki Pratibha, by Nobel laureate Rabindranath Tagore. The actors were selected from among jailbirds and Nigel played the lead role of dacoit Ratnakar, who transforms into sage Valmiki.
That play transformed Nigel in real life. It also helped in opening new avenues for him following his release from prison in 2009 after serving a nine-year term.
“I was mesmerized by the acceptance that I got after Valmiki Pratibha. Sometimes, looking at my past, I have wondered whether I deserve such love and affection,” said Nigel, who now owns a cleaning and security agency and employs several former convicts.
Nigel’s big break came when he got the chance to play the lead role opposite Rituparna Sengupta in Muktodhara.

Background  
Culture therapy is a tiny streak of hope and positivity amidst the gloom that inmates find themselves in. The therapy, known to bring about a complete metamorphosis in the convicts and enable them to alter their lives, is the most crucial part of the film. Culture therapy was initially started by the then IPS BD Sharma in West Bengal. Dancer Alokananda Roy assisted him. They successfully instilled change in many convicts. Later, the court released the convicts on the grounds of goodwill and conduct. Muktodhara is the first film in the history of Indian cinema to be made on culture therapy.

Release  
Muktodhara was released on 3 August 2012. The premiere of the movie was the first-ever theme premiere in Bengal. The entire movie hall was made to look like a correctional home and every artiste came in like a convict. 
The movie created history and was a huge hit; it set a new benchmark receiving an overwhelming response from the audience.

See also 
 Icche
 Accident
 Alik Sukh
 Ramdhanu

References

External links 
 
 

2012 films
Films directed by Nandita Roy and Shiboprosad Mukherjee
Bengali-language Indian films
2010s Bengali-language films
Indian prison films